The Getrag F20 5-speed manual transmission was fitted to many vehicles in the European General Motors production line up including for the UK the Vauxhall Astra DOHC 2.0i GTE 16 valve, Vauxhall Cavalier GSi 2000 16 valve DOHC and Vauxhall Calibra 2.0i 16 valve DOHC. Everywhere else under the Opel brand name the Calibra, Vectra A, Astra F & Kadett E. It was a 5 speed transmission with the following specifications:

Clutch Diameter  
1st Gear Ratio 3.55:1 
2nd Gear Ratio 2.16:1 
3rd Gear Ratio 1.48:1 
4th Gear Ratio 1.13:1 
5th Gear Ratio 0.89:1
Reverse Gear Ratio 3.33:1 
Final Drive Ratio 3.55:1. 3.42:1 or 3.72:1 found in 4WD F20's.

There are two types of flywheel, depending on the manufacturing year. Kadetts had "Flat" flywheels, which are lighter, while Astras, Vectras and Calibras had "Pot" flywheels, which are heavier to make a more comfortable ride.

The clutch is cable-driven, and has a big fork on the outside-top part of the housing. It has a cover in the bell housing that lets you change the clutch disc without taking off the gearbox.
It has a lot of similarities with the Getrag F16 Gearbox, that has a weaker main shaft. It also has a lot of similarities with the Daewoo D16 and D20 Gearboxes.

There have been many references to the numbering designation that Opel elected to utilise for gearboxes, one of the more common arguments is that it refers to the ft·lbf torque capacity of the gearbox, in this case being a  torque limit.  Other arguments include that it is simply related to the engine size (the F20 gearbox was often fitted to 2.0L engine vehicles and the F16 gearbox usually was fitted to 1.6 or 1.8l size engines. )

As an example the F20 transmission was fitted to the Opel Calibra, Vectra A, Astra F & Kadett E with C20XE 2.0l 16V Engines.

References 

General Motors transmissions
Getrag transmissions